Lohawat Assembly constituency is one of constituencies of Rajasthan Legislative Assembly in the Jodhpur (Lok Sabha constituency).

List of members

Election results
2018 results

References

Jodhpur district
Assembly constituencies of Rajasthan